The 51st United States Colored Infantry Regiment was a U.S.C.T. infantry regiment in the Union Army during the American Civil War. It was organized from the 1st Mississippi Infantry March 11, 1864. It served in various posts in the Department of the Gulf and fought in the Battle of Fort Blakely as part of the Pensacola Column and the assault and capture of Fort Blakely April 9. The Siege of Fort Blakely took place from April 1–9, 1865. The 51st was mustered out on June 16, 1866.

See also
List of United States Colored Troops Civil War units
List of Mississippi Union Civil War units

Sources
National Park Service: Battle Unit Details: United States Colored Troops

United States Colored Troops Civil War units and formations
1864 establishments in the United States
Military units and formations established in 1864
Military units and formations disestablished in 1866